Ombo is an island in the municipality of Stavanger in Rogaland county, Norway. The  island is the largest island in the Ryfylke region and the second largest island in Rogaland county. There are several villages on the island including Jørstadvåg, Atlatveit, and Eidssund in the western part of the island and the villages of Tuftene, Skipavik, Skår, and Vestersjø are located on the southeastern part of the island. Jørstad Church is located in the village of Jørstadvåg.

Prior to 2020, the island was divided between the municipalities Hjelmeland and Finnøy. In 2020, the island joined Stavanger municipality.

The island is at the northeastern edge of a large group of islands in the Boknafjorden. Ombo is located north of the islands of Randøy and Halsnøya, northeast of the island of Finnøy, and east of the Sjernarøyane archipelago. Ombo is surrounded by fjords that are connected to the main Boknafjorden. The Ombofjorden to the east, Gardssundfjorden to the south, Gapafjorden to the west, and Jelsafjorden to the north.

After the road was built around the island of Ombo, a distinctive rock formation was visible from the new road. The rock formation looks like a face, and was originally named Adam. Among the local residents, this is also called "Ombo-gubben".

There are no outside road connections to Ombo—it is only accessible by boat.  There are regular ferry connections that stop at Eidssund on the west coast from Judaberg, Sjernarøyane, Nedstrand, Jelsa, Halsnøya, and Fogn.  There are also regular ferry connections from Skipavik on the eastern shore of the island to Nesvik and Hjelmelandsvågen on the mainland.

See also
List of islands of Norway

References

Islands of Stavanger